Dam Ab (also Romanized as Dam Āb and Dam-e Āb) is a village in Naghan Rural District, Naghan District, Kiar County, Chaharmahal and Bakhtiari Province, Iran. At the 2006 census, its population was 227, in 59 families. The village is populated by Lurs.

References 

Populated places in Kiar County
Luri settlements in Chaharmahal and Bakhtiari Province